Detienne is a surname. Notable people with the surname include: 

Marcel Detienne (1935–2019), Belgian historian
Paul Detienne (1924–2016), Belgian Jesuit priest

French-language surnames